The Celia Thaxter House is an historic house at 524 California Street in the village of Newtonville in Newton, Massachusetts. The Italianate house was built c. 1856 as the home of Levi Lincoln Thaxter and American poet and author Celia Thaxter.  The Thaxters lived here until 1880 when she moved to Kittery Point, Maine.  It was in the Newtonville house that Celia Thaxter wrote her early poetry, and where the Thaxters played host to high-profile members of Boston's literary community.

The house was listed on the National Register of Historic Places in 1986.

See also
 National Register of Historic Places listings in Newton, Massachusetts

References

External links
 Celia Thaxter House -- National Register of Historic Places Travel Itinerary
 Celia Thaxter House -- Newton History Museum
 Celia Thaxter Timeline

Houses on the National Register of Historic Places in Newton, Massachusetts
Italianate architecture in Massachusetts
Houses completed in 1856